Kevin Patrick Dobson (March 18, 1943 – September 6, 2020) was an American film and television actor, best known for his roles as Detective Bobby Crocker, the trusted protege of Lt. Theo Kojak (played by Telly Savalas) in the CBS crime drama Kojak (1973–1978), and as M. Patrick "Mack" MacKenzie in the prime time soap opera Knots Landing (1982–1993).

On April 1, 2008, Dobson made his first appearance in the NBC Daytime soap opera Days of Our Lives in the role of Mickey Horton.

Early life
Dobson was born in Jackson Heights, New York, and was of Irish descent. He was one of seven children born to the janitor of a grammar school (Our Lady of Fatima, Jackson Heights, New York) and a stay-at-home mother. Before embarking on an acting career, Dobson worked as a trainman, brakeman, and conductor for the Long Island Rail Road, followed by a few years as a waiter.

Career
After a brief appearance in the 1971 film Klute, and small acting roles on TV series such as The Mod Squad, Emergency!, and Cannon, Dobson signed a contract with Universal Studios in 1972. This led to his role of Det. Bobby Crocker, Lt. Theo Kojak's young partner, in the TV series Kojak, opposite Telly Savalas. For the role, he had to borrow a suit. He had twice auditioned and failed, then called his agent, telling him, "'Do what you have to do,' so he called in a favor and I read for them [again]. I was a military policeman in the Army, so I knew how to hold a gun and throw somebody against a wall. I got a call [the next night] asking if I'd sign a contract." Dobson auditioned for a third time and finally won the role. He remained with Kojak for its entire five-season run from 1973 to 1978, and later reunited with Savalas for the 1990 TV movie, Kojak: It's Always Something, his character having become an assistant district attorney. They remained friends until Savalas' death from bladder cancer in 1994.

In 1976, Dobson was on Battle of the Network Stars with Savalas (Captain), Adrienne Barbeau, Gary Burghoff, Pat Harrington, Bill Macy, Lee Meriwether, Mackenzie Phillips, Loretta Swit, and Jimmie Walker. In 1978, Dobson played Pete Lomas in the two-part TV movie The Immigrants, based on the novel by Howard Fast. 

In 1981, Dobson starred as Det. Jack Shannon, a San Francisco police officer who is a single father, on the CBS series Shannon. However, the show failed to gain substantial ratings and was canceled after nine episodes. A more successful TV role for Dobson followed in 1982 as M. Patrick "Mack" MacKenzie in the prime-time soap opera Knots Landing, opposite Michele Lee. He joined the show at the beginning of its fourth season in September 1982 and remained in the role until its cancellation in 1993. Dobson won five Soap Opera Digest Awards for his work on the series. He later reunited with his Knots Landing co-stars for a miniseries, Knots Landing: Back to the Cul-de-Sac in 1997, and again in the 2005 non-fiction special Knots Landing Reunion: Together Again.

Dobson also appeared in a number of feature films, most notably the World War II movie Midway (1976) alongside Henry Fonda and Charlton Heston, as Ensign George Gay — a pilot and the sole survivor of Torpedo Squadron Eight from the Aircraft Carrier 's ill-fated opening attack against the Japanese fleet on June 4, 1942. Another prominent role was as Bobby Gibbons, the husband of Cheryl Gibbons (Barbra Streisand) in the 1981 romantic comedy All Night Long. He also had a small role as a priest in the well-received 2007 psychological horror film 1408.

Dobson continued to appear in a number of television roles, including the syndicated F/X: The Series for one season (1996–1997) and the daytime drama series One Life to Live (2003), The Bold and the Beautiful (2006–2007), and Days of Our Lives, where he was the fourth and final actor to play original character Mickey Horton. He featured in 15 episodes of the show from April to October 2008. The character then left with no explanation, before being "killed off" in January 2010. Although Mickey is best remembered for being portrayed by veteran soap actor John Clarke for almost 40 years, Dobson instead appeared as Mickey in the character's final appearances in 2008.

Stage roles
Dobson starred in the Tony Award winning play 'Art' at the Royal George Theater in Chicago. He originated the role of Steve Gallop in the world premiere of the American Theatre Critics Association nominated stage play "If it was Easy..." at The 7Stages Theater in Atlanta, Georgia, and appeared in many other stage roles across the United States.

He starred with Richard Thomas in the 2009 stage production of 12 Angry Men. Dobson stated, concerning actors who are afraid of being typecast, "You should be so lucky."

Affiliations
Dobson, a former Army soldier (MP), served twice as chairman of the National Salute To Hospitalized Veterans. Having long assisted with the needs of hospitalized veterans, Dobson received the AMVETS (American Veterans) Silver Helmet Peace Award and the American Legion Award.  Dobson, was a life member of AMVETS and also a charter member of AMVETS MOH Richard A. Pittman Post #1947 - Stockton, California.

Personal life and death
Dobson married his wife, Susan, in 1968. They had three children: Mariah, Patrick and Sean. He was the chairman of the United Veterans Council of San Joaquin County (UVCSJC). Dobson died after struggling with an autoimmune deficiency on September 6, 2020 in Stockton, California. UVCSJC reported his death the following day. He was 77.

Filmography

Films

Television

References

Citations

Sources

External links

1943 births
2020 deaths
Male actors from Los Angeles
Male actors from New York City
American male film actors
American male television actors
American people of Irish descent
American male soap opera actors
American male stage actors
People from Jackson Heights, Queens
Military personnel from New York City